The 2022 bet365 US Darts Masters was the fourth staging of the tournament by the Professional Darts Corporation. It was the first event in the 2022 World Series of Darts. The tournament featured 16 players (8 PDC representatives, and 8 North American representatives), and was held at the Hulu Theater in New York City on 3–4 June 2022.

Nathan Aspinall was the defending champion after his 8–4 win over Michael Smith in the 2019 final, but he was not invited to take part in this tournament.

Smith won his second World Series title after defeating Michael van Gerwen 8–4 in the final.

Prize money
The total prize fund remained at £60,000.

Qualifiers
The PDC announced the 8 players who would be their elite representatives at the event on 11 April 2022, including Fallon Sherrock, who was denied her chance to appear on the 2020 World Series of Darts circuit, owing to the COVID-19 pandemic.

  (semi-finals)
  (semi-finals)
  (runner-up)
  (champion)
  (quarter-finals)
  (quarter-finals)
  (quarter-finals)
  (first round)

The North American qualifiers consisted of their four PDC Tour Card holders (Jeff Smith, Danny Baggish, Matt Campbell and Jules van Dongen), plus four spaces at the CDC qualifier in Indianapolis on May 13. The winner of each of the two qualifiers, plus the two highest ranked players on the Order of Merit qualified.

Draw
The draw was made on 1 June in Times Square by Rod Harrington.

References

US Darts Masters
World Series of Darts
Sports competitions in New York City
2022 in sports in New York City
US Darts Masters